South Mugirango is an electoral constituency in Kenya. It is one of nine constituencies in Kisii County. The constituency was established for the 1992 elections.

It is one of three constituencies in Gucha District.

Members of Parliament 

manson nyamweya 2013-2017
Sylvanus osoro 2017-to date

Wards

Etago and Gucha South Sub-counties
South Mugirango has two sub-counties within its boundaries: Etago and Gucha South. Each sub-county is headed by the sub-county administrator, appointed by a County Public Service Board.

References 

Constituencies in Kisii County
Constituencies in Nyanza Province
1992 establishments in Kenya
Constituencies established in 1992